Meristogenys amoropalamus is a species of frog in the family Ranidae. It is endemic to northern Borneo and occurs in northwestern Sabah and northeastern Sarawak (Malaysia) and in northeastern Kalimantan (Indonesia). Common names mountain Borneo frog and mountain torrent frog have been coined for it. Studies of its larvae revealed that the nominal species contained two cryptic forms, and in 2011, Shimada and colleagues described Meristogenys dyscritus as a separate species.

Etymology
The specific name amoropalamus  is derived from the Greek words amoros (="incomplete") and palame (="web") and refers to the poorly developed toe webbing of this species.

Description
Adult females grow to about  snout–vent length, whereas males are considerably smaller. Males are less robustly built than females and have a relatively much larger tympanum. The snout is comparatively blunt. The fingers and the toes bear round discs; the toes are fully only partially webbed. The dorsum is light brown and has small dark spots on the trunk. The lower parts are whitish.

Habitat and conservation
The tadpoles adhere to rocks and feed on lithophytes.

This species is threatened by habitat loss caused by logging and agricultural activities. It is also collected for food. It occurs in the Kinabalu and Crocker Range National Park in Malaysia, and in the Betung Kerihun National Park and Pulong Tau National Park in Indonesia; the latter is not (yet) well protected.

References

amoropalamus
Endemic fauna of Borneo
Amphibians of Indonesia
Amphibians of Malaysia
Amphibians described in 1986
Taxonomy articles created by Polbot
Amphibians of Borneo